Federico Porras Jr. is a Mexican child actor, known for A que no me dejas, Los Miserables and Por siempre amor.

Career
Porras began studying acting at age five in the Children's Center for Arts Education Televisa (CEA Children) with Eugenio Cobo.

At the beginning of 2012, he was cast for the film ¿Qué le dijiste a Dios?, directed by Teresa Suarez. By mid-2012, he received his first big break by playing "Mateo" the son of Zuria Vega and Gabriel Soto on the hit soap opera "Un Refugio para el Amor".

He subsequently participated in productions such as La Mujer del Vendaval (Special Performance), La Rosa de Guadalupe ("Sin Miedo a Hablar" y "La Luz de la Luciérnaga"), the film Vladimir en Mí" directed by Octavio Reyes, Km 31.2 the film, Qué pobres tan richos for half of 2014 as Fede "Nachito". He performed with Alexandra de la Vega and Javier Diaz Dueñas in the telenovela Los miserables, produced by Telemundo, starring Aracely Arambula, Erik Hayser, Aylin Mujica and Aaron Diaz.

In May 2015 he began working on Televisa's telenovela A Qué No Me Dejas in the character of René.

In January 2016 Fede joined the telenovela Simplemente María portraying Juan Pablo.

Filmography

Television

Films

External links

Living people
Mexican male child actors
2005 births